Human rights in Chad have been described as "poor"; for example, Freedom House has designated the country as "Not Free." Chad received a score of 7 for political rights and 6 for civil liberties (with 1 being the most free, 7 being the least free).

According to the U.S. State Department, "The government's poor human rights record deteriorated further during the year; security forces committed numerous serious human rights abuses." Among the abuses listed were extrajudicial killings, beatings, torture, and rape by security forces; limits on freedom of speech and the press and freedom of assembly; arbitrary arrest and detention; and widespread corruption.  Security forces commit these and other abuses with "near total" impunity.

Amnesty International has reported that "The widespread insecurity in eastern Chad had particularly severe consequences for women, who suffered grave human rights abuses, including rape, during attacks on villages" by Janjawid militia from Sudan. Women face widespread discrimination and violence. Female genital mutilation, while technically illegal, is still widely practiced.
Harassment of journalists and human rights activists has also been documented as well as the use of child soldiers by Chadian security forces, by various human rights groups.

Transparency International has ranked Chad as one of the most corrupt nations in the world. In 2007, it scored 1.8 out of 10 on the Corruption Perceptions Index (with 10 being the least corrupt). Only Tonga, Uzbekistan, Haiti, Iraq, Myanmar, and Somalia scored lower. Critics of former President Idriss Déby accused him of cronyism and favoring his own tribe, the Zaghawa.
Déby's re-election in May 2006—in which he won a third term—was boycotted by the opposition, who denounced the results as fraudulent. The previous election, in 2001, was similarly viewed as fraudulent by the opposition parties, although a team of foreign observers said that polling had taken place "without major problems or intimidation".

Historical situation
The following chart shows Chad's ratings since 1972 in the Freedom in the World reports, published annually by Freedom House. A rating of 1 is "most free" and 7 is "least free".

International treaties
Chad's stances on international human rights treaties are as follows:

See also 

Freedom of religion in Chad
Human trafficking in Chad
Internet censorship and surveillance in Chad
LGBT rights in Chad
Politics of Chad

Notes 
1.Note that the "Year" signifies the "Year covered". Therefore the information for the year marked 2008 is from the report published in 2009, and so on.
2.As of January 1.
3.The 1982 report covers the year 1981 and the first half of 1982, and the following 1984 report covers the second half of 1982 and the whole of 1983. In the interest of simplicity, these two aberrant "year and a half" reports have been split into three year-long reports through interpolation.

References

External links
 2012 Annual Report, by Amnesty International
 Freedom in the World 2012 Report, by Freedom House
Review of Chad by the United Nations Human Rights Council's Universal Periodic Review, May 5, 2009. (Scroll down past Belize.)